Minuscule 313 (in the Gregory-Aland numbering), Nλ46 (Soden), is a Greek minuscule manuscript of the New Testament, on paper. Palaeographically it has been assigned to the 14th century.

Description 

The codex contains the text of the Gospel of Luke 1:1-12:16 on 460 paper leaves. The text is written in one column per page, in 28-32 lines per page. The biblical text is surrounded by a catena.

Text 

The Greek text of the codex is a representative of the Byzantine text-type. Aland placed it in Category V.
It was not examined by the Claremont Profile Method.

History 

The manuscript once belonged to Cardinal Mazarin (like codex 14, 311, 324). 
It was added to the list of New Testament manuscripts by Scholz (1794-1852). 
It was examined and described by Paulin Martin. C. R. Gregory saw the manuscript in 1885.

The manuscript is currently housed at the Bibliothèque nationale de France (Gr. 208) at Paris.

See also 

 List of New Testament minuscules
 Biblical manuscript
 Textual criticism

References

Further reading 

 

Greek New Testament minuscules
14th-century biblical manuscripts
Bibliothèque nationale de France collections